Wadi Qabbani, also known as Khirbat ash Sheik Husein was a Palestinian Arab village in the Tulkarm Subdistrict. It was probably depopulated during the 1947–48 Civil War in Mandatory Palestine on March 1, 1948, as part of Operation Coastal Clearing. It was located 12 km northwest of Tulkarm. The name, Qabbani  came  from the Lebanese family who owned most of the land.

History

British Mandate era
In  the 1945 statistics  the village had a total population of 210 Muslims with a total of 9,812 dunams of land.

The land ownership of the village before occupation in dunams:

Of this, Arabs used 408 dunums  for cereals, while a total of 1,301 dunams were classified as non-cultivable land.

Types of land use in dunams in the village in 1945:

References

Bibliography

External links
 Welcome To Wadi Qabbani
Wadi Qabbani, Zochrot
Survey of Western Palestine, Map 10:    IAA, Wikimedia commons

Arab villages depopulated during the 1948 Arab–Israeli War
District of Tulkarm